J. Edward Meyers (December 22, 1862 – June 11, 1944) was an American insurance salesman, philanthropist, and politician and the 27th mayor of Minneapolis.

Early life and education 
Meyers was born in Dayton, Ohio and moved to Minneapolis to attend the University of Minnesota Law School.

Career 
After a brief period spent in Duluth, Minnesota, he returned to Minneapolis in 1888 and began a career in the insurance business with Aetna. In 1918, Meyers ran for mayor on a patriotic platform supporting America's soldiers in World War I dubbed the "Loyalty Party." He defeated socialist incumbent Thomas Van Lear and served for a single term, working particularly hard to ensure returning military veterans were able to find housing and jobs. He did not run for re-election but later became involved in the city's board of education and board of estimate.

Personal life 
Meyers died in 1944. Just a month before his death, it was revealed that Meyers has been the anonymous benefactor behind a Minneapolis-based group called "Youth, Incorporated" which provided Americanist materials to Minneapolis children. He is buried in Lakewood Cemetery in Minneapolis.

References

1862 births
1944 deaths
Mayors of Minneapolis
Politicians from Dayton, Ohio
Burials at Lakewood Cemetery
School board members in Minnesota
University of Minnesota Law School alumni